is a passenger railway station located in the city of  Funabashi, Chiba Prefecture, Japan, operated by the private railway operator Shin-Keisei Electric Railway.

Lines
Takanekōdan Station is served by the Shin-Keisei Line, and is located 19.5 kilometers from the terminus of the line at Matsudo Station.

Station layout 
The station consists of a single island platform, with an elevated station building.

Platforms

History
Takanekōdan Station was opened on August 1, 1961. It takes its name from a local public housing project.

Passenger statistics
In fiscal 2018, the station was used by an average of 15,643 passengers daily.

Surrounding area
 Funabashi City Hall Takanedai Branch Office
 Funabashi City Takanedai Junior High School
 Funabashi City Takanedai Daisan Elementary School
 Funabashi City Takanedai Daini Elementary School

See also
 List of railway stations in Japan

References

External links

  Shin Keisei Railway Station information

Railway stations in Japan opened in 1961
Railway stations in Chiba Prefecture
Funabashi